Selaginella cinerascens is a species of spikemoss known by the common names mesa spikemoss, gray spikemoss, and ashy spikemoss. It is native to Baja California as well as some locations just north of the border in San Diego County, California. It grows in dry habitat, often on clay soil, both in open areas and in the shade of larger plants. This lycophyte forms mats of spreading, forking stems up to 18 centimeters long. The plant is often gray or brown in color, forming a dull-colored carpet on the substrate. The linear or lance-shaped leaves are 1 to 3 millimeters long and lack bristles at the tips. The leaves are green when new or moist. They are flattened to the stem or stick out just a little. The strobili borne at the leaf bases are yellow in color and no more than 4 to 5 millimeters long.

References

External links
Jepson Manual Treatment
USDA Plants Profile
Flora of North America
Photo gallery

cinerascens
Plants described in 1899
Flora of Baja California
Flora of California
Flora of North America